Eliodoro Matte Larraín (born 5 November 1945) is a Chilean billionaire businessman, president of the Chilean forestry and paper company CMPC, that he inherited from his father.

Matte was born on 5 November 1945, the son of Eliodoro Matte Ossa. He took on a bachelor's degree in a civil industrial engineering from the University of Chile (without graduating), followed by an MBA from the Booth School of Business, University of Chicago.

He is chairman of the think tank Centro de Estudios Públicos (CEP).

As of October 2015, Forbes estimated his net worth at US$2.7 billion.

He is married to Pilar Capdevila, and they have three children: Eliodoro Matte Capdevila, Jorge Matte Capdevila, and María del Pilar Matte Capdevila.

References

1940s births
Living people
Chilean businesspeople
Chilean businesspeople in timber
Chilean billionaires
Elidoro
Pontifical Catholic University of Chile alumni
University of Chicago Booth School of Business alumni
Chilean manufacturing businesspeople
Matte